The 1960 Oregon State Beavers football team represented Oregon State College as an independent during the 1960 NCAA University Division football season.  In their sixth season under head coach Tommy Prothro, the Beavers compiled a 6–3–1 record and outscored their opponents 197 to 145. They played two home games on campus at Parker Stadium in Corvallis and two at Multnomah Stadium in Portland.

The Pacific Coast Conference (PCC) disbanded in 1959; this was the second of five years that Oregon State and Oregon competed as independents. The Civil War game was played in Corvallis and ended in a tie.

The Gotham Bowl was scheduled to premiere at Yankee Stadium in New York City in 1960 with Holy Cross as the host team.  However, after Oregon State was invited, Holy Cross was uninvited in hopes of finding a better match-up.  The game was canceled when no opponent could be found for Oregon State.

After this season, the university's current title, Oregon State University, was adopted by a legislative act signed into law by Governor Mark Hatfield on March 6, 1961, and became effective that summer.

Schedule

Roster
HB Terry Baker, So.
HB Rich Brooks, So.
HB Art Gilmore, Sr.
QB Marne Palmateer, Jr.
   T Neil Plumley, Jr.
QB Bill Sullivan, Jr.
   E Aaron Thomas, Sr.

Professional football drafts

NFL Draft

AFL Draft

References

External links
 Game program: Oregon State at Washington State – November 5, 1960
 WSU Libraries: Game video – Oregon State at Washington State – November 5, 1960

Oregon State
Oregon State Beavers football seasons
Oregon State Beavers football